Simon Findlay Crean (born 26 February 1949) is an Australian politician and trade unionist. He was the Member of Parliament for Hotham from 1990 to 2013, representing the Labor Party, and served as a Cabinet Minister in the Hawke, Keating, Rudd and Gillard Governments. He was the Leader of the Labor Party and Leader of the Opposition from November 2001 to December 2003.

Crean was born in Melbourne, Victoria. His father, Frank Crean, was Deputy Prime Minister of Australia under Gough Whitlam. After studying law and economics at Monash University, Crean joined the trade union movement, becoming General Secretary of the Storemen and Packers' Union in 1979. He became Vice President of the Australian Council of Trade Unions (ACTU) in 1981, and in 1985 was elected as ACTU President, succeeding Cliff Dolan. Crean stood down from this role upon his election to the Australian Parliament at the 1990 election, and immediately entered the Government as Minister for Science and Technology. He served in various roles until Labor was defeated at the 1996 election.

Following Labor's 1998 election defeat, Crean was elected Deputy Leader of the Labor Party, replacing Gareth Evans. He was later elected unopposed to succeed Kim Beazley as Leader of the Labor Party following further defeat at the 2001 election, becoming Leader of the Opposition. Despite initial enthusiasm for his leadership, Crean quickly struggled in opinion polling, and in June 2003, Beazley challenged him for the leadership. Although Crean won comfortably, speculation about his leadership only intensified, and in November 2003 he announced that he would resign, making Crean the first Leader of the Labor Party never to face a federal election; he was replaced by his Shadow Treasurer, Mark Latham.

Despite losing the leadership, Crean remained a senior figure within the Labor Party, and returned to the Cabinet as Minister for Trade when the Labor won the 2007 election. Crean supported Julia Gillard in her leadership challenge to Kevin Rudd in June 2010, and remained in the Cabinet after she was successful. Although he continued to support Gillard through the leadership spill in February 2012, in March 2013 he announced that he was switching support to Rudd, sparking another leadership spill; Gillard sacked him from the Cabinet in response. When Rudd eventually did return as Prime Minister at the leadership spill in June 2013, Crean ran unsuccessfully to return to the role of Deputy Leader; he subsequently announced his decision to retire from politics at the 2013 election.

Early life and education
Crean was born in Melbourne, the son of Frank Crean, a federal Labor MP from 1951 to 1977, who was both Treasurer and Deputy Prime Minister in the Whitlam Government from 1972 to 1975. One of his two brothers, David Crean, was formerly a Member of the Tasmanian Parliament. His other brother, Stephen Crean, died while skiing alone at Charlotte Pass, New South Wales in 1985, aged 38; his body was not found for two years.

Crean was educated at Melbourne High School, before going on to Monash University where he graduated with a Bachelor of Economics and Bachelor of Laws.

Trade unionist
Following his graduation from Monash University, Crean worked in several roles with various trade unions, before becoming an official within the Storeman and Packers Union (SPU). In 1977, his father, Frank Crean, retired from Federal politics.  Simon contested the Labor preselection for his father's comfortably safe seat of Melbourne Ports, but lost to former Victorian Labor Leader Clyde Holding, who went on to win the seat. In 1979, Crean was elected General Secretary of the SPU, which entitled him to a seat on the board of the Australian Council of Trade Unions (ACTU).

In 1981, Crean was elected as ACTU Vice President, before in 1985 winning election as ACTU President. In this role, he played a key role in negotiating numerous agreements on wages and other industrial issues as part of the Prices and Incomes Accord with the Government of Prime Minister Bob Hawke, himself a former ACTU President.

Political career

Hawke and Keating Governments

Ahead of the 1990 election, Crean was easily selected as the Labor candidate for the safe seat of Hotham; he was elected to Parliament on 24 March, and immediately entered the Cabinet as Minister for Science and Technology. He became Minister for Primary Industries and Energy in 1991, retaining this job when Paul Keating replaced Bob Hawke as Prime Minister in December 1991. After Labor's victory at the 1993 election, Keating moved Crean to become Minister for Employment, Education and Training, a role he would hold until 1996.

Opposition
After the Labor Party was heavily defeated at the 1996 election, Crean chose to contest the deputy leadership, but was defeated by Gareth Evans by 42 votes to 37. He joined the Shadow Cabinet, and after Evans retired from politics following Labor's 1998 election defeat, Crean was easily elected to replace him, becoming Deputy Leader of the Opposition and Shadow Treasurer. In January 2001, Crean was awarded the Centenary Medal.

In November 2001, following Labor's third consecutive election defeat, Crean was elected unopposed to replace Kim Beazley as Leader of the Labor Party, becoming Leader of the Opposition; Jenny Macklin was elected as his deputy, also unopposed. On 4 February 2003, Crean led the Labor Party to condemn Prime Minister John Howard's decision to commit Australian troops to the Iraq War.

Throughout most of 2003, poor opinion polling led to speculation of a leadership challenge against Crean; on 16 June 2003, Crean called a leadership spill intending to put an end to the leadership tensions, winning against Kim Beazley by 58 votes to 34. This failed to stop Crean losing even further ground to Howard in opinion polls as preferred Prime Minister, and on 28 November 2003, Crean announced that he would resign as Leader of the Labor Party, stating that he felt he no longer had the confidence of his colleagues; this made him the first Labor Leader not to contest a federal election since 1916. On 2 December, Shadow Treasurer Mark Latham defeated Kim Beazley in a ballot by 47 votes to 45 to replace Crean; Latham subsequently appointed Crean immediately as Shadow Treasurer. After Labor suffered a fourth consecutive defeat at the 2004 election, Crean resigned from his Shadow Treasurer position; he initially intended to resign from the Shadow Cabinet entirely, but at Latham's insistence, he accepted the role of Shadow Minister for Trade.

Crean retained this position when Beazley returned to the leadership in January 2005. However, in a reshuffle of the Shadow Cabinet in June 2005, Crean was demoted to Shadow Minister for Regional Development. He then faced a pre-selection challenge for his seat of Hotham from Martin Pakula, a member of his former union, the SPU, a move which Crean publicly blamed on Beazley, Hong Lim, and the Labor Right. Beazley refused to publicly support either candidate, but several frontbenchers, including Julia Gillard, supported Crean. This helped Crean to comfortably win the pre-selection for his seat; Crean singled out Senator Stephen Conroy for his part in the move against him, describing his front-bench colleague as "venal" and "one of the most disloyal people I've ever worked with in my life". Following the replacement of Kim Beazley by Kevin Rudd as leader in December 2006, Rudd reappointed Crean as Shadow Minister for Trade.

Rudd and Gillard Governments

After Labor's victory at the 2007 election, new Prime Minister Kevin Rudd appointed Crean to the Cabinet as Minister for Trade. In this role, Crean visited Singapore and Vietnam to pursue Australia's trade and economic interests at a range of ministerial and other high-level meetings. Crean also attended the APEC Meeting of Ministers Responsible for Trade and the OECD Roundtable on Sustainable Development on behalf of the Australian Government. Crean also co-chaired the 8th Joint Trade and Economic Cooperation Committee with the Vietnamese Minister of Planning and Investment Võ Hồng Phúc in Hanoi, leading to an improvement in the trading relationship between Australia and Vietnam.

Following Julia Gillard's election unopposed as Prime Minister in June 2010, Crean was appointed to replace Gillard in the role of Minister for Education, Employment and Workplace Relations, with Stephen Smith taking over as Minister for Trade. After the 2010 election, Gillard reshuffled the Cabinet and appointed Crean as Minister for the Arts and Minister for Regional Development and Local Government.

On 21 March 2013, following significant leadership tensions arising from poor opinion polling, Crean called for Gillard to spill the leadership, with the aim of encouraging Rudd to challenge for the position of Prime Minister. This marked a change in Crean's position; he had long been a committed supporter of Gillard. Crean said he would challenge Wayne Swan for the role of Deputy Leader, if Rudd ran for the leadership. However, Rudd declined to run for the leadership, leaving Gillard to retain the leadership unopposed. Gillard quickly sacked Crean from the Cabinet, expressing publicly her disappointment at his "disloyalty" to her. Before his sacking, Crean had been one of the few federal politicians to have never spent a day on the backbench. After Rudd did eventually replace Gillard as Prime Minister in June 2013, Crean ran for the position of Deputy Leader but was defeated by Anthony Albanese by 61 votes to 38. Crean subsequently announced he would retire from politics at the 2013 election.

Crean retired as the first person to serve as a Cabinet Minister under four different Labor Prime Ministers (in Crean's case, Hawke, Keating, Rudd and Gillard) since Jack Beasley (who served under James Scullin, John Curtin, Frank Forde and Ben Chifley).

Career after politics 
In October 2014, Crean was elected chairman of the Australian Livestock Exporters Council. He was re-elected for a second term in 2016.

Personal life 

Crean is married and has two grown up children. He is a supporter and patron of the North Melbourne Football Club.

See also
 Fourth Hawke Ministry
 First Keating Ministry
 Second Keating Ministry
 First Rudd Ministry
 First Gillard Ministry
 Second Gillard Ministry

References

Further reading
 Lyle Allan (2002), 'ALP Modernisation, Ethnic Branch Stacking, Factionalism and the Law,' in People and Place, Vol.10, No.4, pp. 50–58
 Ross McMullin (1992), The Light on the Hill. The Australian Labor Party 1891–1991, Oxford University Press, South Melbourne (Victoria),

External links

 
  Australian Trade Union Archives biographical entry
 Crean resigns as shadow Treasurer
 Mark Latham steps in to save Crean
 

1949 births
Australian Labor Party members of the Parliament of Australia
Labor Right politicians
Australian Leaders of the Opposition
Australian people of Irish descent
Gillard Government
Government ministers of Australia
Living people
Members of the Australian House of Representatives
Members of the Australian House of Representatives for Hotham
Members of the Cabinet of Australia
Monash Law School alumni
Politicians from Melbourne
Rudd Government
Trade unionists from Melbourne
People educated at Melbourne High School
Recipients of the Centenary Medal
Leaders of the Australian Labor Party
21st-century Australian politicians
20th-century Australian politicians